Roger Davies may refer to:

 Roger Davies (actor), English actor known for Renford Rejects and The Cloverfield Paradox
 Roger Davies (manager) (born 1952), Australian-born manager in the music industry
 Roger Davies (footballer) (born 1950), English footballer, MVP of the North American Soccer League in 1980
 Roger Davies (astrophysicist) (born 1954), English astrophysicist

See also
 Rodger Davies (1921–1974), U.S. Ambassador to Cyprus who was assassinated in 1974
 Roger Davis (disambiguation)